"" ("In the Midst of Life we are in Death") is a Lutheran hymn, with words written by Martin Luther based on the Latin antiphon "Media vita in morte sumus". The hymn in three stanzas was first published in 1524. The hymn inspired composers from the Renaissance to contemporary to write chorale preludes and vocal compositions. Catherine Winkworth translated Luther's song to English in 1862. It has appeared in hymnals of various denominations.

History 
The Latin antiphon "Media vita in morte sumus" dates back to the 11th century. A German version appeared in Salzburg in 1456. Martin Luther added in 1524 two stanzas following the same scheme. The same year it appeared also in Eyn Enchiridion in Erfurt, titled "Der Lobsanck / Mitten wir ym leben synd." (The song of praise /).

Catherine Winkworth translated Luthers hymn to English in 1862, titled "In the Midst of Life". A translation titled "In the Very Midst of Life" appeared in 1941 in The Lutheran Hymnal. It has appeared in hymnals of various denominations. The song is part of the Protestant hymnal Evangelisches Gesangbuch as EG 518. The first stanza is included in the Catholic hymnal Gotteslob as GL 503.

Text 
The Latin text has ten lines of different length, with irregular meter. Lines 7 to 9 are reminiscent of the Trisagion, "Sanctus deus, Sanctus fortis, Sanctus immortalis, miserere nobis" (Holy God, Holy Strong One, Holy Immortal One, have mercy on us).

When Luther added two stanzas, he kept the structure, rendering the final request for mercy in each stanza as the Greek "Kyrieleis". From stanza to stanza, a line explains the respective line in the previous stanza, leading from death in the midst of life to hell in the midst of death, in the third stanza to sin as the reason for fear of hell.

The lyrics are given in today's form, with the Latin original corresponding to the first stanza:

Melody and setting 
The melody printed in the Wittenberg is based on the earlier one, adapted by Johann Walter.

J. S. Bach composed a four-part chorale harmonization, BWV 383.

Felix Mendelssohn composed an SSAATTBB motet a cappella as the third part of his Kirchenmusik, Op. 23.

Enjott Schneider wrote in 2015 a piece for organ and percussion, called Media vita – Mitten wir im Leben sind.

See also 
 List of hymns by Martin Luther

References

External links 
  

16th-century hymns in German
Hymn tunes
Hymns by Martin Luther
1524 works